Urumattram is a 2003 Tamil short film directed by B.Sivakumar. It won Best Environment / Conservation / Preservation Film at the 50th National Film Awards.

Plot 
The story revolves around a grandfather, his son and grandson. The son who is in hurry to migrate to the U.S. is convinced he has tied up all the loose ends like securing the future of his family as well as the care of his old father. The grand father is shocked by the sale of the ancestral home and is completely shattered by the irresponsibility of maximising gain in turning it over to a plastic factory owner.

The old man is redeemed by the youngster who picks up hope from the grand father's values - of environment awareness and human relationship.

Awards
Screened at International Environmental film Festival, VFICA, held in Brazil, 2003.
Special invite at International SASA Awards 2003, ROME Selected for Vatavaran, 2003.
Awarded Best short film at New Jersey international film Festival, 2004.
Winner of the 50th National Film Award for Best Film on Environment Conservation/Preservation received personally from President Mr. A.P.J. Abdul Kalam

References

External links 
 Official Page for Directorate of Film Festivals, India
 National Film Awards Archives
 National Film Awards at IMDb

Indian short films
Best Film on Environment Conservation/Preservation National Film Award winners
2000s Tamil-language films